Hoplitimyia costalis is a species of soldier fly in the family Stratiomyidae.

Distribution
Brazil.

References

Stratiomyidae
Insects described in 1836
Taxa named by Francis Walker (entomologist)
Endemic fauna of Brazil
Diptera of South America